The  Kola Tembien February 2021  massacres were a mass extrajudicial killing that took place in Kola Tembien in the Tigray Region of Ethiopia during the Tigray War, on 10 February 2021. Kola Tembien is a district that belongs to the Central zone of Tigray.

Massacre
The Ethiopian National Defense Force (ENDF) and Eritrean Defence Forces (EDF) killed dozens of civilians in a killing spree across villages in Kola Tembien (Central Tigray) on 10 February 2021. 

Typical massacres committed by Ethiopian and Eritrean soldiers in the Tigray war are (1) revenge when they lose a battle; (2) to terrorise and extract information about whereabouts of TPLF leaders; (3) murder of suspected family members of TDF fighters; and (4) terrorising the Tigray society as a whole such as in case of mass killings in churches.
The Kola Tembien massacres were particularly a revenge for lost battles further west in the Jawmaro mountains, while terrorising the Tigrayan society at the same time.

Perpetrators
 The Telegraph  reported the perpetrators as being Ethiopian and Eritrean soldiers.

Victims
The Tigray: Atlas of the humanitarian situation mentions 122 victims, and The Telegraph 182, of which 18 have been identified.

Reactions
Eritrea’s information minister, Yemane Gebremeskel, could not address this massacre specifically, but stated that the government of Eritrea has zero tolerance for and never targets civilians in war. ‘’The Telegraph’’ asked the Ethiopian Prime Minister’s office to comment but received no answer.
The “Tigray: Atlas of the humanitarian situation”, that documented this massacre received international media attention, particularly regarding its Annex A, that lists massacres in the Tigray War.

After months of denial by the Ethiopian authorities that massacres occurred in Tigray, a joint investigation by OHCHR and the Ethiopian Human Rights Commission was announced in March 2021.

References

External links
World Peace Foundation: Starving Tigray

2021 massacres of the Tigray War
February 2021 crimes in Africa
2021 murders in Ethiopia
Massacres committed by Eritrea